Arild Rebne (born 29 November 1972) is a retired Norwegian football midfielder.

He played for Vind IL and SK Gjøvik-Lyn before joining Hamarkameratene. He made his Norwegian Premier League debut on 23 May 1994, and got 49 league games in total.

He then left for Gjøvik-Lyn, but in 1998 he moved to Raufoss IL. Ahead of the 2005 season he went to Gjøvik-Lyn for a new period. He also coached the team in 2008.

References

Norwegian footballers
Hamarkameratene players
Raufoss IL players
Sportspeople from Gjøvik
1972 births
Living people
Eliteserien players
Association football midfielders